Albert Stanaj (born 12 February 1994), known professionally as Stanaj, is an Albanian-American singer and songwriter.

Life and career

1994–present: Early life and continued success 

Albert Stanaj was born to Albanian parents on 12 February 1994 in Albania and was raised in the city of New York, the United States. Stanaj attended the Archbishop Stepinac High School in White Plains, New York. He also participated in numerous music festivals in Albania, Europe as well as the United States. At 18, he moved to Los Angeles to continue his professional musical career. His debut single "Ain't Love Strange" released in 2016 peaked at number two in Albania.

Artistry 

Stanaj has cited Justin Timberlake, Maxwell, Michael Jackson and Whitney Houston as his major influences.

Discography

Albums

Extended plays

Singles

As lead artist

As featured artist

Other charted songs

Songwriting credits

Notes

References

External links 

1994 births
21st-century Albanian male singers
21st-century American male singers
21st-century American singers
Albanian guitarists
Albanian pianists
Albanian songwriters
American people of Albanian descent
American guitarists
American pianists
American songwriters
English-language singers
Living people
Musicians from New York City